Leptidea duponcheli, the Eastern wood white,   is a  butterfly found in the   Palearctic (South Europe, Asia Minor, Balkans, Iran) that belongs to the whites family.

Subspecies
Leptidea duponcheli duponcheli
Leptidea duponcheli lorkovici (Pfeiffer, 1932) turkisch Nordsyrien
Leptidea duponcheli maiae Alberti, 1969 Armenia, Greater Caucasus.
Leptidea duponcheli vartiani Gross & Ebert, 1975 Iran

Description from Seitz

L. duponcheli Stgr. (27 g), from South France, the eastern districts of South Europe, Asia Minor, Armenia, and Persia, differs from sinapis in the marking of the underside, as shown in the figure. — In the summer-form aestiva Stgr. (27 g) the upperside is feebly, the underside more strongly yellow, the latter being without markings.

Biology
The larva feeds on ''Onobrychis, Leguminosae.

References

External links
Lepidoptera Caucasi

Leptidea